Qaradağlı (also, Karadagly) is a village and municipality in the Agdash Rayon of Azerbaijan. It has a population of 1,259. The municipality consists of the villages of Qaradağlı and Malay.

References 

Populated places in Agdash District